The codename Tinsel referred to a type of equipment carried by RAF bombers and used for jamming Luftwaffe night-fighter controller's speech radio-frequencies during the Second World War.

The equipment consisted of an audio microphone mounted inside one of the bomber's engine nacelles, the output of which fed into the aircraft's standard T1154 radio transmitter. The wireless operator could listen in to the frequencies used by the defending forces and then, when he heard a German transmission, tune his transmitter into the Luftwaffe frequency and transmit the amplified engine-noise on the same frequency, thus jamming the enemy transmission.

Although not very effective as a jammer, the noise produced merely acted as background noise to the transmitted speech, Tinsel did have the effect of making the night-fighter crew's job of distinguishing the instructions received from the ground more difficult.

See also
List of World War II electronic warfare equipment

World War II British electronics